The Legislature of Guam is the law-making body for the United States territory of Guam. The unicameral legislative branch consists of fifteen senators, each serving for a two-year term. All members of the legislature are elected at-large with the island under one whole district.  After the enactment of the Guam Organic Act in 1950, the First Guam Legislature was elected composing of 21 elected members. Today, the current fifteen-member 37th Guam Legislature was elected in November 2022.

History

American Period: 1898–1941, 1944–present
Spain lost Guam during the 1898 Spanish–American War in a bloodless invasion. For the next forty years, the United States Navy assumed executive control of the island, treating it more as a military outpost than an overseas territory, with little to no civilian say in the island's affairs. Governor Captain Willis Winter Bradley instituted the Guam Congress during the 1930s as an elected advisory body to the naval governor. On December 8, 1941, Imperial Japanese forces invaded Guam, beginning a three-year occupation of the island. The island was eventually retaken in 1944 during the intense Battle of Guam.

Following the end of the war, the U.S. Navy attempted to resume military control of the islands, much to the dismay of the local Chamorro population who demanded greater rights on the heels of the harsh Japanese occupation. The U.S. federal government listened. The result was the Guam Organic Act of 1950 signed by President Harry S. Truman. The act established a civilian territorial government with executive, legislative, and judicial branches. It was the first time that Guam had a democratic civilian government.

Speakers of the Guam Legislature

Structure of the Guam Legislature 
The Guam Organic Act of 1950 provides for the establishment of the Guam Legislature.  The Organic Act provides that the Guam Legislature is a unicameral body with up to twenty-one members and that elections shall be held every two years.  Until a change to Guam law in 1996, the Guam Legislature had 21 members, called senators, but since then it has had 15 senators. Senators of the Guam Legislature have been elected both by a number of at-large districts and by an island-wide at-large election.  Since the 1980s, senators of the Guam Legislature have been elected at-large through an open partisan primary and a subsequent island-wide election.

Qualifications 
The qualifications for membership in the legislature are expressly stated in the Organic Act of Guam:
a candidate must be at least twenty-five years old, and;
a candidate must have lived on Guam for at least five years preceding the sitting of the legislature in which they seek to become a member.

Seat 
The legislature currently meets at the Guam Congress Building along Chalan Santo Papa in the village of Hagåtña, directly across from the Dulce Nombre de Maria Cathedral Basilica.

Historic composition 
The biennial legislative terms and the years of general elections are listed in the table below, along with the number of Democratic, Republican, and Independents and Other Parties' seats in each respective legislative term.

See also
List of state and territorial capitols in the United States

References

External links 
 Guam Legislature's Official Website

Government of Guam
Guam
Guam
1950 establishments in Guam
Politics of Guam